Paracanoeing at the 2020 Summer Paralympics in Tokyo, Japan took place at the Sea Forest Waterway, the same location where the rowing took place. This was the second appearance of paracanoe in the Paralympic Games and the debut of all three va'a events.

The 2020 Summer Olympic and Paralympic Games were postponed to 2021 due to the COVID-19 pandemic. They kept the 2020 name and were held from 24 August to 5 September 2021.

Qualification
A total of 91 athletes qualified for paracanoeing at the 2020 Summer Paralympics. Each NPC could enter a maximum of 9 athletes (one qualification spot per event); however, an athlete could enter both kayak and va'a events in their assigned categories as long as they contested those events in one of the competitions mentioned below. Qualification spots were allocated through one of the following methods:
The 6 top ranked athletes in each Paralympic event at the 2019 ICF Canoe Sprint World Championships obtain one qualification spot for their NPC.
The 4 top ranked athletes not already qualified (as above) in each Paralympic event at the 2021 ICF Paracanoe World Cup obtain one qualification spot for their NPC.
If the host country hasn't qualified any athletes at a male kayak, male va'a, female kayak or female va'a event, one spot is taken from the 2021 World Cup quota and allocated to the event where an athlete from that country achieved the best rank.
At least three continents must be represented in each event. If this minimum is not reached, spots are taken from the 2021 World Cup quota and given to the NPC of the best ranked athlete from a different continent.
If there aren't enough NPCs eligible at the 2021 World Cup in a given event, the corresponding 2019 World Championships rank is used to fill the remaining spots.

Competition schedule

Participating nations
Qualification slots are allocated as follows:

Medal table

Medalists

See also
Canoeing at the 2020 Summer Olympics

References

External links
Results book 

2020 Summer Paralympics events
Paracanoe at the Summer Paralympics
Canoeing and kayaking competitions in Japan
Paralympics
Paracanoeing at the 2020 Summer Paralympics